The 1968 Rugby League World Cup tournament was the fourth staging of the Rugby League World Cup, and was held in Australia and New Zealand during May and June in 1968. Contested by the men's national rugby league football teams of the two host countries plus Great Britain and France, for the first time a final to determine the World Cup was specifically pre-arranged (previous finals having only been used when teams finished level on points). Financially it was a profitable venture for the competing nations.

The 1968 World Cup was the first to be played under limited tackles rules, the number then being four tackles. The round 1 match between Great Britain and Australia attracted an attendance of 62,256, the highest for a World Cup match until 1992. The final was held at the Sydney Cricket Ground; a crowd of 54,290 watched Australia defeat France. The stars of the Australian team in the tournament were skipper Johnny Raper, second-rower Ron Coote, who scored spectacular tries in each and every game, and the dead-shot kicker Eric Simms, who harvested a record 25 goals (50 points).

Squads

Venues

Results 

France: Jean-Claude Cros; Daniel Pellerin, Michel Molinier, Jean-Pierre Lecompte, André Ferren;
Jean Capdouze, Roger Garrigue; Georges Ailleres (c), Yves Bégou, Christian Sabatié,
Francis de Nadaï, Henri Marracq, Jean-Pierre Clar
New Zealand: R Tait; R Mincham, H Sinel, P Schultz, E Wiggs;
J Bond (c), J Clarke; O Danielson, Colin O'Neil, George Smith,
B Lee, J Dixon, A Kriletich; Henry Tatana.
After only twelve minutes, New Zealand second-rower Brian Lee was sent off in a match in which the classy French stand-off Jean Capdouze bagged 13 points. The game was also notable for the first World Cup substitution when Adolphe Alésina replaced second-rower Francis de Nadaï.

A record World Cup crowd of 62,256 saw New Zealand referee John Percival mercilessly penalising Great Britain, with debutant full-back Eric Simms booting a record eight goals in Australia's win.

Simms repeated the feat of kicking eight goals as he had in the previous match as Australia eventually killed off New Zealand at Brisbane after trailing for much of the game.

France surprised Britain in a rain-ruined match at Auckland with an uncharacteristically stubborn defensive display and winger Jean-René Ledru, scoring the winning try to qualify for a World Cup Final showdown against Australia.

In the final preliminary game in Brisbane, Australia's scrum-half back Billy Smith dropped three goals. French winger Jean-René Ledru and Australia's prop Artie Beetson were both sent off.

Final standings

Final 

The final had been billed a 'debacle' following Great Britain's inexplicable loss to France in Auckland, resulting in France contesting the final against Australia despite having been beaten by Australia seven tries to none two days prior. Nonetheless, it attracted a record crowd of 54,290 for a World Cup Final match.

The undefeated Australians went into the tournament decider as favourites. However France offered stern resistance and held the Australians to 0–7 at half-time and with quarter of an hour were only 0–12 down before losing 2–20. It was Australia's second World Cup title.

Try scorers 
4

  Ron Coote
  Lionel Williamson
  Clive Sullivan

3

  Paul Schultz

2

  Bob Fulton
  Johnny Greaves
  Johnny King
  Billy Smith
  Ian Brooke
  Alan Burwell

1

  Fred Jones
  Johnny Raper
  Jean Capdouze
  Jean-René Ledru
  Arnie Morgan
  Mick Shoebottom
  Spencer Dunn

References

Inline

General

External links 
 1968 World Cup at rlhalloffame.org.uk
 1968 World Cup at rlwc2008.com
 1968 World Cup at rugbyleagueproject.com
 1968 World Cup data at hunterlink.net.au
 1968 World Cup at 188-rugby-league.co.uk